Japanese Russian or Russian Japanese may refer to:
Japanese-Russian relations (c.f. "a Japanese-Russian treaty")
Japanese language education in Russia (c.f. "Russian Japanese education")
Cyrillization of Japanese
Eurasian (mixed ancestry) people of Japanese and Russian descent

See also
Japanese people in Russia
Russians in Japan